A pet shop or pet store is a retail business which sells different kinds of animals. Pet stores also sell pet food, supplies, and accessories.

Pet Shop may also refer to:
 Pet Shop (film), a 1994 kid's film
 Pet Shop, the sixth set in the Lego Modular Buildings series
 The Pet Shop, an early American television program broadcast on the now defunct DuMont Television Network
 Pet Shop Boys, an English electronic dance music duo
 Pet Shop Boys: A Life in Pop, a 2006 documentary about English electronic dance music duo Pet Shop Boys
 "Pet Shop" sketch, a popular sketch or one act from Monty Python's Flying Circus
 Littlest Pet Shop, a toy franchise owned by Hasbro
 Littlest Pet Shop (video game), a video game of the Littlest Pet Shop franchise for the PC, Wii, and Nintendo DS
 Littlest Pet Shop (1995 TV series), an American animated television series based on the Littlest Pet Shop toys
 Littlest Pet Shop (2012 TV series)
 Pet Shop of Horrors, a Japanese horror manga created by Matsuri Akino
 Pet Shop (JoJo's Bizarre Adventure), a fictional character
 Pet Shop, the original name of the Canadian television series Pet Corner